Acacia rossei, also known as Yellowdine wattle,<ref name=austseed>{{cite web|url=https://www.australianseed.com/shop/item/acacia-rossei|title=Acacia rossei''' Yellowdine Wattle|accessdate=9 August 2020|publisher=Australian Seed}}</ref> is a shrub of the genus Acacia and the subgenus Phyllodineae that is endemic to south western Australia. 

Description
Like most species of Acacia it has phyllodes rather than true leaves. The tick and evergreen phyllodes are crowded on the branchlets and are patent to erect. It blooms from August to January and produces yellow flowers. The inflorescence are composed of spherical flowerheads that are densely pack with 65 to 75 golden coloured flowers.

Taxonomy
The species was first formally described by the botanist Ferdinand von Mueller in 1893 as part of the work Descriptions of new Australian plants, with occasional other annotations (continued) as published in The Victorian Naturalist. It was reclassified as Racosperma rossei by Leslie Pedley then transferred back to genus Acacia in 2006. It resembles and is thought to be closely related to Acacia glutinosissima and Acacia handonis'' found in Queensland has the same type of excrescences on the seed pod.

Distribution
It is native to an area in the Wheatbelt and Goldfields-Esperance regions of Western Australia where it is commonly situated on sandplains growing in sandy lateritic soils. The range of the shrub extends from around Kellerberrin in the west to around Hyden in the south and Yellowdine in the east and is commonly found in disturbed areas like road verges and will regenerate after bushfires, it is usually a part of tall shrubland communities.

Cultivation
The shrub is sold commercially and is known for the showy flower display. It prefers an open position in full sun in a light well drained soil and is moderately frost tolerant and drought resistant.

See also
List of Acacia species

References

rossei
Acacias of Western Australia
Taxa named by Ferdinand von Mueller
Plants described in 1893